This is a list of prime ministers of Belarus since the Belarusian declaration of independence in 1918.

Belarusian People's Republic (1918–1920)

Chairmen of the People's Secretariat

Chairmen of the Council of Ministers

Rada of the Belarusian Democratic Republic (since 1920)

Chairmen of the Council of Ministers
Following the fall of the Belarusian People's Republic, the Rada went into exile—first to Vilnius to 1925, then to Prague before settling in Canada.

Byelorussian Soviet Socialist Republic (1920–1991)

Chairmen of the Council of People's Commissars

Chairmen of the Council of Ministers

Republic of Belarus (1991–present)

Prime ministers

See also
 List of national leaders of Belarus
 President of Belarus

References

External links

 
Belarus
Prime minister